Artem Zakharov (born 19 June 1996) is a Ukrainian football midfielder.

Career
Zakharov is a product of the FC Metalurh Zaporizhzhia youth team system.

He made his debut for Metalurh Zaporizhzhia in the Ukrainian Premier League in the match against FC Zorya Luhansk on 17 July 2015.

References

External links
 
 

1996 births
Living people
Ukrainian footballers
FC Metalurh Zaporizhzhia players
Ukrainian Premier League players
Place of birth missing (living people)
Association football midfielders